The Gulf Daily News (GDN) is an English-language local newspaper published in the Kingdom of Bahrain by Al Hilal Group. The paper, which is one of six daily newspapers in Bahrain, calls itself "The Voice of Bahrain".  Al Hilal Group publishes 13 other newspapers and magazines, including the local Arabic language newspaper Akhbar Al Khaleej.

History
The Gulf Daily News was the first daily English newspaper to be published in Bahrain. It was founded in March 1978 by the Al Hilal Group, which is also the publisher. The group also publishes Akhbar Al Khaleej, an Arabic daily.

Until the publishing of Bahrain Tribune, the paper was Bahrain's only English newspaper. The paper was created to provide news to the English-speaking residents of Bahrain, consisting mainly of British, Americans, Filipinos, Indians and Pakistanis. The staff are a mixture of Bahrainis, British, Filipinos and Indians.

Traditionally, the Gulf Daily News is a pro-government publication, despite its largely balanced coverage of domestic affairs following political reforms instigated after 2001. Its staff includes both Sunni and Shia Muslims, while other faiths represented in its workforce include Christians, Hindus, and Sikhs.

The newspaper is currently owned by the Al Hilal Group. The paper is based in Bahrain with its editorial offices located at Isa Town and commercial offices in Exhibition Road.

The newspaper has a paid daily circulation of 11,500 copies. News content is primarily local, political and social news, but the paper also features international business and social news deemed to be of interest to its readership.

In addition, the GDN has a monthly online readership of more than 200,000,

A revamped website of the Gulf Daily News was launched in June 2015. The website also caters to the people of GCC countries including UAE, Saudi Arabia and Qatar. While the readers have to pay for the local Bahrain content, other sections are free to access.

In 2020, the newspaper launched a social media platform, focused primarily at providing a publishing platform for its local readership.

Reporters
Reporters for the GDN currently include Mohammed Al A'ali (Bahraini), Sandeep Singh Grewal (Indian), Raji Unnikrishnan (Indian), Avinash Saxena (Indian), Reem Al Daaysi (Bahraini) and Naman Arora (Canadian).

Notable past journalists include Arthur Macdonald (Scottish), Mandeep Singh (Indian), Indira Chand (Indian), Reem Antoon (Iraqi), Colin Young (British), Robert Smith (British), Amira Al Husseini (Bahraini), Eunice Del Rosario (Filipino), Sara Wickham (British), Tariq Khonji (Bahraini), Soman Baby (Indian), Noor Toorani (Bahraini), David Fox (Zimbabwean) and Mohammed Mohsen (Bahraini).

Reporters who have since died include Les Horton (British), Richard Moore (American), Vinitha Vishwanath (Indian), Sanjay Santiago (Indian) and Mohammed Aslam (Bahraini).

The newspaper has several columnists who write regularly about local issues.

Format
The paper has a page size of 36 cm x 26 cm and a column width of 3.45 cm with 7 columns per page. It is printed via Web Offset and has a 100 lpi (Black & White and colour) screen

The newspaper is organized in four sections:

News: Includes International, National, Business, Sports, Weather.
Opinion: Includes Editorials, Op-Eds and Letters to the Editor.
Features: Includes Cinema schedules, Local events, Crossword/Games, Cartoons, Horoscopes, Channel schedules.
Classifieds

References

External links

1978 establishments in Bahrain
English-language newspapers published in Arab countries
Newspapers published in Bahrain
Newspapers established in 1978
Mass media in Manama